The 2000 Stanley Cup Finals was the championship series of the National Hockey League's (NHL) 1999–2000 season, and the culmination of the 2000 Stanley Cup playoffs. It was contested by the Eastern Conference champion New Jersey Devils against the Western Conference champion and defending Stanley Cup champion Dallas Stars. The Devils were led by captain Scott Stevens, head coach Larry Robinson and goaltender Martin Brodeur. The Stars were led by captain Derian Hatcher, head coach Ken Hitchcock and goaltender Ed Belfour. The Devils defeated the Stars 4–2 in a six-game series to win their second Stanley Cup in franchise history.

Paths to the Finals

New Jersey defeated the Florida Panthers 4–0, the Toronto Maple Leafs 4–2 and the Philadelphia Flyers 4–3 to advance to the Finals.

Dallas defeated the Edmonton Oilers 4–1, the San Jose Sharks 4–1 and the Colorado Avalanche 4–3 to advance to the Finals.

Game summaries
Despite New Jersey being a lower seed in conference play (4) than Dallas (2), New Jersey's 103 points were one more than Dallas, giving them home-ice advantage in the series. The Devils won the Cup in game six on a one-timer goal by Jason Arnott in double overtime. It was their second Stanley Cup overall and first since 1995.

For the Stars, this was the first time since the New York Islanders lost to the Edmonton Oilers in the 1984 Finals that a defending Stanley Cup champion lost in the Finals. This happened to the Devils themselves the following year when they lost to the Colorado Avalanche. This would be the last appearance in the Stanley Cup Finals for the Stars until 2020.

This was the first Finals that featured two relocated teams competing for the Stanley Cup, as well as the first Finals in which both teams had won the Stanley Cup previously after relocation.

Team rosters
Years indicated in boldface under the "Finals appearance" column signify that the player won the Stanley Cup in the given year.

Dallas Stars

New Jersey Devils

Stanley Cup engraving
The 2000 Stanley Cup was presented to Devils captain Scott Stevens by NHL Commissioner Gary Bettman following the Devils 2–1 double overtime win over the Stars in game six.

The following Devils players and staff had their names engraved on the Stanley Cup

1999–2000 New Jersey Devils

Broadcasting
In Canada, the series was televised on CBC. In the United States, this was the first year under the new joint American TV contract with the Disney-owned networks ESPN and ABC, with ESPN airing the first two games of the Cup Finals and ABC broadcasting the rest of the series. Devils team broadcasters Mike Miller and Randy Velischek called the series on local radio on WABC–AM 770 in New York City. In Dallas, Stars broadcasters Ralph Strangis and Daryl Reaugh called the series on WBAP 820 AM.

Quotes

See also
 1999–2000 NHL season
 2000 Stanley Cup playoffs
 List of Stanley Cup champions

References

Notes

 
Stanley Cup
Dallas Stars games
New Jersey Devils games
Stanley Cup Finals
Ice hockey in the Dallas–Fort Worth metroplex
Stanley Cup Finals
Stanley Cup Finals
Sports competitions in East Rutherford, New Jersey
Sports competitions in Dallas
2000s in Dallas
20th century in East Rutherford, New Jersey
Stanley Cup Finals
Stanley Cup Finals
Ice hockey competitions in New Jersey
Ice hockey competitions in Texas